Detection Unit consisted of several high-profile officers of Mumbai Police. The squad primarily dealt with members of the Mumbai underworld and other criminal gangs.

Gang wars in Mumbai
The Unit came to be known as the "Encounter Squad" because of its involvement in the encounter killings. It came into prominence in the 1980s and 1990s, when they started dealing with Dawood Ibrahim's D-Company gang, the Arun Gawali gang and the Amar Naik gang.

The 'encounter’, was a euphemism for a situation in which a gangster was cornered, asked to surrender, ostensibly attacked the police or tried to escape, and was shot dead in retaliatory action. As the encounters increased, so did the popularity of the "encounter specialist." Daya Nayak, Valentine D'Souza, Pradeep Sharma, Ravindranath Angre, Praful Bhosale, Raju Pillai, Vijay Salaskar, Shivaji Kolekar, Sachin Vaze and Sanjay Kadam became cult figures, mythologised by the media.

The first encounter occurred on 11 January 1982 when gangster Manya Surve was shot dead by police officers Raja Tambat and Isaque Bagwan at the Wadala area. The famous killing of Maya Dolas in the 1991 Lokhandwala Complex shootout bought focus on this unit for first time. More than 400 criminals from different gangs were killed by this squad.

Since the cracking of the 1993 Mumbai Bomb blasts case, the squad played an instrumental role in controlling the Dawood Ibrahim, Chota Rajan, Ashwin Naik, Ravi Pujari, Ejaz Lakdawala, Ali Budesh, and Arun Gawli gangs in Mumbai.

The squad was dissolved after rival dons Dawood and Chota Rajan fled India, but revived after the 11 July 2006 Mumbai train bombings. Then after 2006 some mysterious hit groups led by an unknown youth from south India ruled with local, national as well as international support continued until the end of 2009. Then they just vanished even as per the police records.

The end of the squad came with the departure of Vaze and Nayak from service, and death of Vijay Salaskar, killed in a gun battle at Rangbhavan Lane during Mumbai 26/11 Terrorist attack.

Portrayals in popular culture
 Ab Tak Chhappan – Nana Patekar playing role of Sadhu Agashe based on Daya Nayak
 Company – Vivek Oberoi playing Chhota Rajan, Mohanlal playing Encounter Squad Chief
 Shootout at Wadala – John Abraham playing Manya Surve, movie on Manya's Encounter,
 Shootout at Lokhandwala – Vivek Oberoi playing Maya Dolas, film based on Maya's Encounter,
 Aan: Men at Work – Character based on real-life inspectors
 Sarfarosh – Fictional story based upon the Indian underworld.
 Encounter: The Killing – It stars Naseeruddin Shah, Dilip Prabhavalkar and Tara Deshpande in pivotal roles.
 Garv – Brothers Salman and Arbaaz Khan play roles of inspectors of Encounter squad
 Golimaar – Gangaram (Gopichand) is an orphan who dreams of becoming a police officer from childhood
 Department – At least one further film is planned.
 Rege – A Marathi film featuring two characters inspired and named after Pradeep Sharma and Sachin Vaze.

References

External links
 Urban Cowboys - TIME
 Bombay's crack 'encounter' police - BBC News
 India can't keep a good don down - Asia Times
 Encounter man Pradip Sharma completes 'century'
 India - Mumbai Mean Streets - ABC news
 Encounter specialists are back in action - Deccan Herald
 Rajan gangster shot dead - The Times of India

Mumbai Police
Government of Mumbai
Organised crime in India
1997 establishments in Maharashtra
Encounters in India